Wolverhampton railway station in Wolverhampton, West Midlands, England is on the Birmingham Loop of the West Coast Main Line. It is served by Avanti West Coast, CrossCountry, Transport for Wales and West Midlands Trains services, and was historically known as Wolverhampton High Level.

History
The first station named Wolverhampton had opened on the edge of the town centre in 1837 on the Grand Junction Railway, this station was renamed Wednesfield Heath in 1855, shortly after the present station was opened, and then was closed in 1873.

On 12 November 1849, the Shrewsbury and Birmingham Railway opened a temporary terminus to its line, at a location very close to the present station.

The present station was opened on 1 July 1852 by the Birmingham, Wolverhampton and Stour Valley Railway, a subsidiary of the London and North Western Railway (LNWR); it was named Wolverhampton Queen Street. The only visible remnant of the original station is the Queen's Building, the gateway to Railway Drive which was the approach road to the station. The building was originally the carriage entrance to the station and was completed three years before the main station building. Today, it forms part of Wolverhampton bus station.

Two years later, on 1 July 1854, the Oxford, Worcester and Wolverhampton Railway (OWWR) opened a second station, located behind the older station on lower ground, which became known as the Wolverhampton Low Level station from April 1856, the other becoming known as Wolverhampton High Level from 1 June 1885.

From 1923, the LNWR was amalgamated into the London Midland and Scottish Railway (LMS), and in 1948 it became part of the London Midland Region of British Railways.

The present Wolverhampton station dates from 1964 to 1967 when the High Level station was completely rebuilt by the architect Ray Moorcroft as part of the modernisation programme which saw the West Coast Main Line electrified. It consisted of three through platforms (the present platforms 1, 2 and 3). In the 1980s, a parcels siding was converted into a south-facing bay platform (the present platform 5), and a new north-facing bay was constructed (the present platform 6).

In 1987 twelve different horse sculptures by Kevin Atherton, titled Iron Horse, were erected between New Street station and Wolverhampton, including one at the southern end of platforms 2 and 3.

More recently (in 2004), a new through platform (platform 4) was constructed on the site of infrequently-used sidings. This has greatly enhanced the capacity of the station. A new footbridge was also constructed, to allow access to the new platform but also to improve access to the existing ones.  A proposal for a more comprehensive redevelopment of the station and surrounding area was announced on 18 October 2006.

Work on the £150 million redevelopment of the station finally began in 2018, and was expected to be completed in 2020, it will eventually include an extension of the West Midland Metro. However delays caused by COVID-19 requirements caused the work to be delayed. Demolition of the 1960s buildings began in May 2020 with the first part of the new station opening the same month. The new station building was fully opened in June 2021, a year later than originally planned.

Management of the station transferred from Virgin Trains West Coast to West Midlands Trains franchise in April 2018.

Services
Typical weekday operations are as follows:

Avanti West Coast:
1tph to London Euston via Birmingham New Street (more in the morning peak)
1tph to Preston, with services alternating every two hours between Blackpool North and Edinburgh. These start or terminate at Carlisle or Preston or Lancaster or Crewe during peak hours.
2 trains per day to Shrewsbury.

London Northwestern Railway:
2tph to Liverpool Lime Street, start/terminating at Crewe or Stafford in the peak hours
2tph to Birmingham New Street, most of which continue to London Euston via Northampton.

West Midlands Railway:
4tph to Birmingham New Street, of which two continue to Walsall
2tph to Shrewsbury, one calling all stations, and the other as a limited stop semi-fast express. Sundays are operated as an hourly service stopping at all stations.
CrossCountry:
2tph to Manchester Piccadilly, via  & Macclesfield (a limited service also runs via Crewe)
2tph to Birmingham New Street, extending to various parts of southern England, such as  Bristol Temple Meads, Exeter St Davids, Reading, Southampton Central  and Bournemouth.

Transport for Wales:
1tp2h to Pwllheli & Aberystwyth, dividing at Machynlleth
1tp2h to Holyhead via Shrewsbury and Chester
1tph to Birmingham International

West Midlands Railway also run a single Saturdays-only parliamentary train on the line to Walsall via Pleck (the former Grand Junction Railway route that continues to New Street via ).  This replaced the regular direct service that ran between 1998 and 2008 (when it was withdrawn due to low usage).  Centro (now called Transport for the West Midlands) hoped to reintroduce a regular service over the line in the future (ideally when the West Midlands area franchise comes up for renewal in 2016/7) and reopen the old station at Willenhall, though it would require some infrastructure improvements here to accommodate it (i.e. a new bay platform & associated signalling).

Platforms

Wolverhampton station has six platforms: platforms 1 to 4 are through platforms, while platforms 5 and 6 are bay platforms at the south and north ends respectively.  Although all four through platforms are reversible, in practice platform 1 is used for northbound services, platform 2 for northbound and southbound services, and platforms 3 and 4 are for southbound services. Platform 3 is also used for northbound services at busy times. Platform 5 is used by local services to Walsall via Birmingham New Street. Platform 6 was designed for local services on the Wolverhampton to Shrewsbury Line (and was formerly numbered Platform 4 but was renumbered upon the construction of the present Platform 4 in 2004) but is now rarely used, as the majority of services on that route travel through to Birmingham (or occasionally to Walsall). It is generally used for the first service of the day to Shrewsbury and for holding trains when they are not in use.

Platform 1 is mostly used for northbound services, however in the late evenings and on Sundays, there are still a few Avanti West Coast shuttle services that either terminate in platforms 1 or 2. These shuttle trains, usually travel to London Euston, via Birmingham New Street. The shuttle trains are usually of 9-car formation.

Platform 2 is now used for all Avanti West Coast services from Edinburgh/Glasgow to London Euston. The timetable change on 8 December 2013 saw Virgin Trains running an hourly timetable from Scotland to Euston via the West Midlands and vice versa, replacing the Wolverhampton – Euston service.

All platforms at the station are electrified to 25 kV AC overhead power.

The Interchange Project
The railway station is earmarked for redevelopment as part of the Wolverhampton Interchange Project. Ion Developments (previously Neptune Developments) were selected for the project and plan to create a major mixed used area that includes both bus and railway stations, a hotel, retail outlets, bars, cafes and offices.

The plan is to completely rebuild the railway station and improve pedestrian access over the ring road, with a new footbridge link direct to the bus station. After a shortfall in funding for the project, it was decided that the development would take place in phases. Phase One began in April 2010 with the construction of the new bus station which was completed in 2011. Phase Two, which includes the railway station, canalside development, and a hotel, has commenced as of September 2018.

On 31 December 2014 the first phase of the redevelopment of the Railway Station was announced, with the redevelopment of the station's car park, it has seen the car park refurbished and extended to take the existing capacity from 520 to just over 900, along with a new entrance to the car park created from Mill Street, and also includes parking for bikes and motorbikes. It is also expected that a hotel will eventually be developed to change the facade of the car park.

From Sunday 8 January 2017, vehicular access to the railway station changed, with access now via Corn Hill. This change coincided with the opening of the extended car park. This has also created a new short stay and drop off area including a new taxi rank. The change has seen Railway Drive completely closed to enable the laying of tracks for the new Metro extension to commence and the rebuilding of the railway station.

On Friday 28 September 2018, work started on Wolverhampton's Railway Station, with the demolition on the Transport Police building. This is the first phase of the new Station build, which will see the main station building demolished once the first half of the new building has been built. The complete Station is due to open in 2020.

The new station building opened on 25 May 2020, completing the first phase of the redevelopment of the railway station. The following week the demolition of the old railway station building commenced, with the whole new building completed in June 2021.

On 29th July 2022, the Central England Co-operative opened a food branch at the station.

West Midlands Metro stop

As part of the Interchange project, West Midlands Metro Line One will be extended to the railway station with the addition of a new Metro stop. It was expected to be operational by 2020, however this has been delayed until spring 2023.

References

Further reading

External links

Rail Around Birmingham and the West Midlands: Wolverhampton station
Wolverhampton Interchange

Railway stations in Wolverhampton
DfT Category B stations
Former London and North Western Railway stations
Railway stations in Great Britain opened in 1852
Railway stations served by CrossCountry
Railway stations served by Transport for Wales Rail
Railway stations served by Avanti West Coast
Railway stations served by West Midlands Trains
1852 establishments in England
Stations on the West Coast Main Line